Nekako s proljeća is the fifth studio album by popular Yugoslav Sarajevo-based pop rock band Crvena jabuka. The album was released during 1991.

Nekako s Proljeća's title track features a guest contribution from Kemal Monteno. This was the first time that the band had ever collaborated with another musician during their career.

The album was very successful, and the band was planning a major tour once again, but the Yugoslav wars moving into Croatia and Bosnia & Herzegovina halted plans. As a result of that, many concert dates had to be cancelled, and the band was starting to break loose. Rhythm guitarist Zlatko Arslanagic had to leave the band during the spring of 1992 when he went to London before coming to Toronto in the summer of 1995. The remainder of the band moved to Zagreb since the start of the war. Zeric opened a  cafe in Sarajevo called "Broj Jedan" (#1).

A remaster was released in 2003 with all twelve tracks included on the original release plus two tracks that were previously omitted: "Sve sto imas Ti", and Bacila je sve niz Rijeku.

Track listing

"Moje najmilije"
"Da nije ljubavi"
"Nekako s proljeća"
"Pusti neka gori"
"6:00"
"Sto pijanih noći"
"Da znaš da me boliš"
"Crvena Jabuka"
"Hajde dođi mi"
"Srce si mi slomila"
"Samo da me ne iznevjeriš ti"
"Nemoj da sudiš preostro o meni"
"Sve što imaš ti" (Remaster)
"Bacila je sve niz rijeku"(live) (Remaster)

Personnel
Dražen Žerić - vocals
Zlatko Arslanagić - rhythm guitar, and backing vocals
Branislav Sauka - bass, rhythm sections arrangement
Darko Jelčić - drums, percussion
Zlatko Volarević - keyboards, and backing vocals
Kemal Monteno - guitar and vocals (Track 3)
Nikša Bratoš - guitar, saxophone, flute, woodwinds, horn, trumpet, harmonica, percussion, keyboards, synthesizers, and backing vocals

1991 albums
Crvena jabuka albums